Tim Ryan Rouillier (born February 4, 1964), sometimes known as Tim Ryan, is an American country music artist. Between 1990 and 1997, Ryan released four major-label studio albums. He also charted six singles on Billboard Hot Country Singles & Tracks chart. His highest charting single, "Dance in Circles," peaked in 1990. Although he has not charted a single since 1993, Ryan has written several songs for other artists, including Phil Vassar's 2006 single "Last Day of My Life". In 2020, Rouillier composed a musical about the state of Montana titled Play Me Montana, which has aired on PBS.

Discography

Albums

Singles

Music videos

References

1964 births
Living people
People from St. Ignatius, Montana
Country musicians from Montana
American country singer-songwriters
American male singer-songwriters
Epic Records artists
BNA Records artists
Warner Records artists
Songwriters from Montana